Probolodus is a genus  of characin endemic to Brazil.

Species
There are currently 3 recognized species of this genus: 
 Probolodus heterostomus C. H. Eigenmann, 1911
 Probolodus oyakawai O. Santos & R. M. C. Castro, 2014 
 Probolodus sazimai O. Santos & R. M. C. Castro, 2014

References

Characidae
Fish of South America
Fish of Brazil
Endemic fauna of Brazil
Taxa named by Carl H. Eigenmann